Whitby Lifeboat Station is a Royal National Lifeboat Institution (RNLI) lifeboat station located in Whitby, North Yorkshire, England. It is one of nine situated along the Yorkshire coast. Whitby has had a lifeboat station since 1802, with the RNLI responsible since 1861. In its 200 plus year history, Whitby has had five different lifeboat stations (although not all operated at the same time).

The present day station covers a huge swathe of the northern coast from the Humber to Hartlepool, and is regularly listed as the busiest in the north of England. The station has two lifeboats; the All-Weather Lifeboat (ALB) George and Mary Webb and the Inshore Lifeboat (ILB) Warter Priory.

History
The first lifeboat to be stationed at Whitby was in 1802 on the west side of the river. This had been paid for by a combination of local finance and an offer from Lloyd's of London who contributed £50 of the £160 needed for a lifeboat. In 1822 an east side station was opened and, also in 1865, another in Upgang; by the end of the 1865, Whitby had four lifeboats under the command of the harbour master. Two of these were the Upgang Lifeboats, which were housed on a stretch of beach at Upgang,  up the coast towards Sandsend. The RNLI always regarded Upgang as being a different lifeboat station, despite its proximity to Whitby, and the fact it was crewed by men from the Whitby station.

The lifeboat stations in Whitby are detailed as follows;

The lifeboat stations have always been in different locations in Whitby on the mouth of the River Esk; between 1822 and 1863, it was located on the original East Pier on the east bank of the river. The present day lifeboat station is also on the east side of the river (further upstream) and was opened in 1919, although another building housed a second lifeboat on the west side of the river between 1895 and 1957. This building has since been re-opened as the Whitby Lifeboat Museum.

The lifeboat disaster of 1861, where twelve of the lifeboatmen died, prompted a local fund-raising effort for their widows and children. This eventually raised over £8,000, but the trustees of the fund thought that supplying the money to the widows and orphans might give them ideas above their station, so a memorial was paid for instead, to be installed in the parish Church of St Mary in the town. Soon after the tragedy, the local lifeboat committee agreed to the RNLI taking over responsibility for the Whitby lifeboats.

In 1881, a ship foundered during a heavy snowstorm in Robin Hood's Bay. The lifeboat stationed in that village was deemed to be unseaworthy and so a telegraph was sent to launch the Whitby lifeboat, the Robert Whitworth. Due to the heavy seas, this had to be taken over land through blizzards and snowdrifts. A similar situation occurred in April 1834, when the lifeboat from Whitby was carried overland to Robin Hood's bay to rescue two women in difficulty.

After this, most RNLI crews were persuaded about the efficacy of using motorised boats over ones with oars; previously, many crews were suspicious of motorised lifeboats. The first motorboat delivered to Whitby was the Margaret Harker-Smith in 1919. She only had a single engine and so was fitted sails and additionally had the capacity for men to row her with oars.

Despite this, Whitby retained a rowing lifeboat until 1957 (the Robert and Ellen Robson), which was the last rowing boat to be officially operated by the RNLI. This boat is now on display in the RNLI museum in Whitby.

In 1966, the first Inshore Lifeboat (ILB) was launched at Whitby. The ILB is useful for rescues where the all-weather lifeboat has difficulty getting to.

On 7 September 2007, the Duchess of Kent formally unveiled a new £1 million lifeboat station in Whitby. The new station was built on the site of the old motor lifeboat station (built in 1918 and in use since 1919), which had become life-expired but was known to the crews as the Tin Shed. Whilst the new lifeboat station was being constructed, the old No 1 lifeboat station, now the museum, was resurrected as the lifeboat house for one year from 2006 to 2007.

In 2018, two crew members from Whitby were sacked after a picture of a fellow crew member was superimposed upon a pornographic image. This doctored photo was then printed upon a mug that one of the crew members kept on the boat. Despite heavy criticism from those sacked, as well as supporting parties, the RNLI upheld the dismissals after an appeal.

Notable incidents
Between 1802 (when the first lifeboat was launched at Whitby) and 2009, 24 lifeboat crew members were lost from Whitby. Their names are commemorated in the RNLI memorial at Poole in Dorset. A news report in 2022 stated that in its more than 200-year history, the Whitby lifeboat had been launched over 2,900 times, and saved over 1,230 people.

Lifeboat disaster (1841)
On 6 October 1841, the east-side lifeboat was on her way to the rescue of two yawls foundering in Whitby Bay. The lifeboat capsized and four lifeboatmen lost their lives.

Lifeboat disaster (1861)
On 9 February 1861, a severe storm struck the east coast of England which resulted in 200 ships being wrecked. The crew had already been out and responded to five ships in distress, when responding to the sixth, a huge wave capsized their vessel. The only survivor of the incident was Henry Freeman, the only member of the crew wearing a cork lifejacket; the other twelve crew, all of who drowned, were wearing their traditional ballast filled lifebelts.

Agenoria (1877) 
The schooner Agenoria which was transporting coal from Hartlepool to Whitby ran aground just outside Whitby harbour on 10 January 1877. The Whitby lifeboat Harriet Forteath launched to try and effect a rescue. During the swell, she capsized and all but one of her 12 crew were thrown into the water. One swam ashore, seven got back into the vessel, but three members of the RNLI crew drowned, with their bodies washing up on the beaches around Whitby in the following days.

The Visitor (1881) 
The Robin Hood's Bay RNLI lifeboat station had been closed in 1855, and the unofficial lifeboat in the village was deemed "unseaworthy" and so a telegraph was sent to launch the Whitby Lifeboat. This took two hours to achieve using the combined strength of 18 horses and 200 men. When the lifeboat and crew arrived, they launched the boat and spent 90 minutes in effecting a rescue of the people still stranded at sea. All survived and a commemorative plaque now memorialises the rescue in the village of Robin Hood's Bay.

The events of The Visitor prompted the RNLI to re-open the lifeboat station at Robin Hoods Bay (until 1931).

SS Rohilla (1914)

Rohilla was launched in 1906 for the British India Steam Navigation Company. She was pressed into war service in 1914 as HMHS Rohilla (His Majesties Hospital Ship). Whilst sailing from the Firth of Forth to Dunkirk to evacuate wounded soldiers, she ran aground on Saltwick Nab reef, which is just south of Whitby Harbour. Despite being only a short distance from the shore, high seas and gale force winds created atrocious conditions for any prospect of a rescue from the shore. One of Whitby's RNLI lifeboats Robert and Mary Ellis attempted to close on the wreck but was forced back by the high waves. Another of Whitby's lifeboats the John Fielden was dragged across the rocky scar to a point adjacent to the wrecked ship and made two successful rescues bringing 35 people to the safety of the shore, however the damage to her hull prevented and further attempts.

An audacious plan to haul the Upgang lifeboat William Riley of Birmingham and Leamington overland to opposite the Rohilla and then lower it by hand down the  cliff was successful however the mountainous sea conditions prevented her launch.

A lifeboat from Scarborough was towed to the scene of the tragedy but they too were thwarted by the storm conditions, they did however stay on the scene throughout the night set to make another attempt at first light which was still pushed back and the lifeboat was towed back to Scarborough.

In all, six lifeboats were launched to try and rescue the 234 people on board over the course of three days. During the grounding of the vessel, she broke her back and several attempts were made to safely remove those onboard. In all, 89 people died in the sinking. Of the six lifeboats launched, only two were motorboats, and because of the perilous waves, only one of the motorboats, the Henry Vernon which had travelled down the coast from Tynemouth was able to get close to what remained of the ship rescuing the last 50 souls. This tragedy was one of the pivotal points that was to see the RNLI introduce motor lifeboats spelling the end for the traditional rowing boat.

Ruswarp flood (1931)
The Whitby Lifeboat was again taken overland to the village of Ruswarp (further upstream of Whitby on the River Esk) in September 1931 due to extreme flooding. The flooding had washed away several bridges and the lifeboat was needed to rescue people from their houses. Despite the narrowness of the walls on the roads and the extreme current, the lifeboat crew (in No. 2 Lifeboat) managed to rescue five people.

Admiral Von Tromp (1976)
On 30 September 1976, the trawler, Admiral Von Tromp, ran aground on Saltwick Bay rocks, much as the Rohilla had done 62 years earlier. Why the boat ran aground some 90 degrees off of her pre-planned course has never been fully explained as the man at the helm of the ship drowned that night. The Whitby Lifeboat was launched and made several attempts to get the men off the stricken boat, but to no avail, even though at one point, the two boats were touching. Eventually, the flooding of the ship led the men to taking to open water from which three were washed ashore, with the skipper of the boat being rescued by the inshore lifeboat from the sea. Two of the trawler men died. At a resultant inquiry, a nautical surveyor stated that even if the boat had been left to its own devices, she would not have been taken upon the rocks by the tide. Two of the RNLI crewmen were awarded RNLI medals, one silver and one bronze, for the mission.

Fleet

Notes

References

Sources

External links

Whitby Lifeboat Museum webpage
Short film from 1910 showing the Whitby Lifeboat on a rescue
Footage of the wreck of the Rohilla and people being rescued from the sea (hosted on British Pathé)

Whitby
Lifeboat stations in Yorkshire
Buildings and structures in North Yorkshire